Maurice A. Ferré Park (formerly Museum Park) is a  public, urban park in downtown Miami, Florida. The park opened in 1976 on the site of several slips served by the Seaboard Air Line Railroad. It was originally named "Bicentennial Park" to celebrate the bicentennial of the United States in that same year. Today, the park is maintained by the Bayfront Park Management Trust. The park is bordered on the north by I-395, Metromover, and the former Miami Herald headquarters, on the south by the American Airlines Arena and Bayside Marketplace, on the west by Biscayne Boulevard and on the east by Biscayne Bay.

The park
The park is served by the Metrorail at Government Center Station and directly by the Metromover's Museum Park Station, Eleventh Street Station and Park West Station.

Museum Park is host to many large-scale events as the park can hold around 45,000 people. Some of these events include Ultra Music Festival, a large, three-day music event, numerous rock concerts such as Warped Tour, various conventions, concerts, as well as boat tours around Biscayne Bay. In March 2009, Museum Park was set to host the Langerado Music Festival, a large three-day festival that was held at the Big Cypress Seminole Indian Reservation every Spring since 2003, but was canceled due to poor ticket sales.

Seven blocks south, is Museum Park's partner park, the  Bayfront Park.

Museum Park underwent a renovation  for the Pérez Art Museum Miami and construction of the new Phillip and Patricia Frost Museum of Science. The $10 million revamp included a new baywalk and a promenade from Biscayne Boulevard to Biscayne Bay that provides pedestrian access to the museums. as it is currently underutilized for large parts of the year. Pérez Art Museum Miami opened in December 2013 and the Frost Museum of Science opened its doors in May 2017. The Dogs and Cats Walkway and Sculpture Gardens opened officially in January 2023.

The Miami Science Barge is a floating marine laboratory and education platform docked in the park. It was opened in 2016 and focuses on three areas, sustainability, alternative agriculture and marine ecology and conservation.

History

From the early 1900s to the mid-1960s, the park had been the location of the Port of Miami, until the port was eventually moved to neighboring Dodge Island in the mid-1960s. Once the port moved out to Dodge Island, the land was cleaned up of industrial residue from decades of port trade, and the park was designed, finally opening up in 1976, as Downtown's second large park after Bayfront Park.

In May 1994, the Omni Loop of the Metromover opened, which brought a Metromover station to the park. In 1996, the station was closed due to lack of use. In 2013, the station was renovated and reopened as Museum Park Station to provide direct access to the art and science museums.

In early 2019, the park was renamed Maurice A. Ferre Park in dedication to former Miami Mayor Maurice Ferré.

Auto racing
Racing events were held on a temporary circuit at Bicentennial Park from 1983-1995 involving IMSA, Trans-Am Series, and CART, and again for FIA Formula E in 2015.

Lap Records
The official race lap records at Bicentennial Park (Miami) are listed as:

Gallery

References

External links
Bicentennial Park
Patricia and Phillip Frost Museum of Science
Pérez Art Museum Miami

Urban public parks
Geography of Miami
IMSA GT Championship circuits
Champ Car circuits
Motorsport venues in Florida
Defunct motorsport venues in the United States
Parks in Miami
Museum districts